Multatuli Museum may refer to two different museums dedicated to the anticolonial Dutch author Multatuli;
 Multatuli Museum (Netherlands), located in Amsterdam, and
 Multatuli Museum (Indonesia), located in Rangkasbitung, Banten, Indonesia.